Calo, Caló, or Calò may refer to:

 Caló language, the language of the Iberian Romani 
 Iberian Kale (calé):
 Romani people in Spain, more frequently called gitanos
 Romani people in Portugal, more frequently called ciganos
 Caló (Chicano), argot or slang of Mexican-American Spanish
 CALO, the Cognitive Assistant that Learns and Organizes, a DARPA project
 Calo (Roman fort), a Roman army encampment near Xanten.

People:
 Calò (surname), an Italian surname
 Caló (surname), a Spanish and Portuguese surname
 Super Caló, stage name of Mexican professional wrestler Rafael García

Calo, Calones
 Calones, military slaves of Ancient Rome

See also

Caloy
 Kalo (disambiguation)

Language and nationality disambiguation pages